Nancy Gee (born 10 April 1968) is a Canadian former alpine skier who competed in the 1988 Winter Olympics.

References

1968 births
Living people
Canadian female alpine skiers
Olympic alpine skiers of Canada
Alpine skiers at the 1988 Winter Olympics